Sludy is the name of several rural localities (villages) in Russia:
Sludy, Novgorod Oblast, a village in Kirovskoye Settlement of Moshenskoy District of Novgorod Oblast
Sludy, Tver Oblast, a village in Vesyegonsky District of Tver Oblast
Sludy, Vologda Oblast, a village in Modensky Selsoviet of Ustyuzhensky District of Vologda Oblast